Robert Lamb Sproull (August 16, 1918 – October 9, 2014) was an American educator, physicist and US Department of Defense official.

Sproull was born in Lacon, Illinois. A graduate of Deep Springs College, Sproull studied English literature at Cornell University before taking a PhD at the same university in physics.  He began a promising and productive career as a physicist at Cornell and headed the Laboratory of Atomic and Solid State Physics (LASSP) and the Materials Science Center.  Sproull left Cornell to become director of ARPA, where he was a strong advocate of cooperation among academia, government, and industry to meet US scientific needs for defense and competition with the Soviet Union.

After taking up an administrative post at Cornell, he became provost and vice president of the University of Rochester in 1968. While at Rochester, he also served on Cornell's board of trustees. In 1970, he became Rochester's president, and the trustees voted in 1974 to make him the university’s chief executive officer. He retired as president and became professor of physics at the university in 1985. He served on the board of the George C. Marshall Institute. He was chairman of the Defense Science Board. He was a member of the Roundtable Council of the National Academy of Sciences.

In 2005, the University of Rochester named its Center for High Intensity Laser Research in his honor. In 2006, Sproull and his wife donated $1 million to create the Robert L. and Mary L. Sproull Fund to support the work of the Cornell Center for Materials Research (CCMR). In 2006, Sproull was awarded the Telluride Tech Festival Award of Technology in Telluride, Colorado.

During his term as President of the University of Rochester, Dr. Sproull was known by the nickname "Particle Bob", a reference to his background in physics.

Books

References

External links 

 Oral history interview transcript with Robert L. Sproull on 11 July 1983, American Institute of Physics, Niels Bohr Library & Archives - interview conducted by Spencer Weart

1918 births
American physicists
People from Lacon, Illinois
Deep Springs College alumni
Cornell University alumni
Cornell University faculty
Cornell Laboratory of Atomic and Solid State Physics
DARPA directors
2014 deaths
United States Department of Defense officials
Presidents of the University of Rochester